Julian Douglas Cunningham (September 14, 1945 – January 13, 2015) was an American football running back in the National Football League for the San Francisco 49ers and the Washington Redskins.  He played college football at the University of Mississippi and was drafted in the sixth round of the 1967 NFL Draft.

References

1945 births
2015 deaths
People from Louisville, Mississippi
American football running backs
Ole Miss Rebels football players
San Francisco 49ers players
Washington Redskins players